David Ewan Marr FAHA (born 13 July 1947) is an Australian journalist, author and progressive political and social commentator. His areas of expertise include the law, Australian politics, censorship, the media and the arts. He writes for The Monthly, The Saturday Paper and Guardian Australia.

Career
Marr attended Sydney Church of England Grammar School in North Sydney and subsequently graduated from the University of Sydney with a Bachelor of Arts in 1968 and a Bachelor of Laws in 1971. Whilst at university   he was a resident of St Paul's College. He worked for a time as an articled clerk at the law firm Allen, Allen and Hemsley, and was admitted as a barrister and solicitor before turning to journalism.

Marr began as a journalist working for The Bulletin magazine and The National Times newspaper in 1972 before being appointed editor in 1980. During this period, he oversaw the publication of the articles by David Hickie which detailed long-suppressed allegations of corruption against former New South Wales premier Robert Askin. The first article, headlined "Askin: friend of organised crime", was famously published on the day of Askin's funeral in 1981.

In 1980, Marr published his first book, Barwick, a "hostile" biography of Chief Justice Sir Garfield Barwick. It won the NSW Premier's Literary Award for Non-Fiction, but was received poorly by its subject, who accused the author of fabricating quotes.

Marr was a reporter on the ABC TV program Four Corners (1985, 1990–91), a role in which he won a Walkley Award, and presenter of Radio National's Arts Today program (1994–1996). From 2002 to 2004, he hosted the ABC TV program Media Watch. He is a frequent guest on ABC TV's Insiders program. During his term as presenter of Media Watch he played a key role in exposing the ongoing cash for comment affair, which Media Watch had first raised in 1999, concerning radio commentators Alan Jones and John Laws. In 2004, the program's exposé of Australian Broadcasting Authority (ABA) head David Flint – who had written letters of support to Jones at a time when Jones was being investigated by the ABA – played a significant role in forcing Flint's resignation.

In 2002, Marr stated on Media Watch that conservative newspaper columnist Janet Albrechtsen had misquoted a French psychiatrist, Jean-Jacques Rassial, and claimed that she had done this deliberately to make it look as though violence and gang rape were institutionalised elements of the culture of Muslim youths. Albrechtsen did not deny the misquote, but responded by accusing Media Watch of inherent left-wing bias and of deliberately leading a witch-hunt against contrary views. When the Minister for Communications, Senator Helen Coonan, appointed Albrechtsen to the board of the ABC in February 2005, Marr publicly questioned whether she was qualified for such a position in light of what he described as "breaches of proper conduct as a commentator and as a journalist".

In 2008, Marr was named by Same Same as one of the 25 most influential gay and lesbian Australians for his coverage of the Bill Henson case.

Marr has advocated drug law reform and has written candidly about his life experiences: "I've had a lot of fun on drugs ... I've had a lot of marvellous experiences. I've danced a lot. I've had a great time. I'm not ashamed of it. And I don't see what's wrong with it."

Marr announced his resignation from the Sydney Morning Herald on 13 July 2012, saying "People underestimate what a deeply conventional person I am. I'm turning 65 and that feels like the right time to go."

However, in April 2013 it was announced that Marr was joining Guardian Australia.

Marr featured prominently in episode 3 of Revelation, ABC's award winning series on clerical abuse in the Catholic Church.

Marr appeared as a semi-regular panellist on the ABC television programs Q&A and Insiders until 2020.

Bibliography

 1980 Barwick, Allen & Unwin, 
 1984 The Ivanov Trail, Nelson, 
 1991 Patrick White: A Life, Vintage Classics, 
 2000 The High Price of Heaven
 
 2004 Dark Victory (with Marian Wilkinson), 
 2007 His Master's Voice: The Corruption of Public Debate under Howard in the Quarterly Essay, Issue 26, 
 2008 The Henson Case, The Text Publishing Company, 
 2010 Power Trip: The Political Journey of Kevin Rudd, in the Quarterly Essay, Issue 38 
 2011 Panic, Black Inc, 
 2012 Political Animal: The Making of Tony Abbott, in the Quarterly Essay, Issue 47, 
 2013 The Prince: Faith, Abuse and George Pell, in the Quarterly Essay, Issue 51, 
 2015 Faction Man: Bill Shorten's Path to Power, in the Quarterly Essay, Issue 59.
 2017 The White Queen: One Nation and the Politics of Race, in the Quarterly Essay, Issue 65.
 2018 My Country: Stories, Essays & Speeches, Black Inc, Hardback  eISBN 9781743820674

Awards
Honorary Doctor of Letters, University of Newcastle, 2011
Honorary Doctor of Letters, University of Sydney, 2013
Honorary Fellowship, Australian Academy of the Humanities, 2013
Liberty Victoria Voltaire Award, 2012
Alfred Deakin Prize for an Essay Advancing Public Debate, for 'Do Not Disturb: Is the Media Asleep?'
Victoria Premier's Literary Awards, 2006
Walkley Awards 2004 (jointly), 1991 and 1985

References

External links
Articles and videos  at The Monthly

1947 births
20th-century atheists
20th-century biographers
20th-century Australian journalists
20th-century Australian male writers
20th-century Australian non-fiction writers
20th-century essayists
20th-century LGBT people
21st-century atheists
21st-century biographers
21st-century Australian journalists
21st-century Australian male writers
21st-century Australian non-fiction writers
21st-century essayists
21st-century LGBT people
21st-century memoirists
Art writers
Australian activists
Australian art critics
Australian art historians
Australian atheists
Australian biographers
Australian drug policy reform activists
Australian essayists
Australian human rights activists
Australian humanists
Australian LGBT journalists
Australian LGBT writers
Australian male non-fiction writers
Australian memoirists
Australian social commentators
Australian television personalities
Critics of conspiracy theories
Critics of neoconservatism
Critics of religions
Critics of the Catholic Church
Free speech activists
Granta people
Journalists from Sydney
Literacy and society theorists
Living people
Male biographers
Mass media theorists
Media critics
People educated at Sydney Church of England Grammar School
Sociologists of art
Sydney Law School alumni
Writers about activism and social change
Writers about globalization
Writers about religion and science
Writers from Sydney